Roberto Aguirre Solís (born 28 April 1957) is a Mexican politician from the National Action Party. From 2000 to 2003 he served as Deputy of the LVIII Legislature of the Mexican Congress representing the State of Mexico.

References

1957 births
Living people
Politicians from the State of Mexico
National Action Party (Mexico) politicians
21st-century Mexican politicians
National Autonomous University of Mexico alumni
Academic staff of the National Autonomous University of Mexico
Deputies of the LVIII Legislature of Mexico
Members of the Chamber of Deputies (Mexico) for the State of Mexico